Bochra Belhaj Hmida, was born in Zaghouan. She is a Tunisian lawyer and politician.

Biography 
Bochra Belhaj Hmida has a Law graduate degree. In 1989, she co-created the Democrat Tunisian Women Association (Association tunisienne des femmes démocrates – ATFD) and is the president of the organisation from 1994 to 1998.

In 2012, she represents, as a lawyer, a young woman who survived a rape by police officers. Ennahda Government is, according to her, responsible morally and politically.

She joins the Democratic forum for work and freedoms (Forum démocratique pour le travail et les libertés) in 2011. She then  run for the constituent assembly election as the leader of the Zaghouan constituency list, but she is not elected.

Bochra Belhaj Hmida is, since September 2012, member of the executive committee of the movement Nidaa Tounes. She got elected at the People Representative Assembly as a representative of the second constituency of Tunis, during the legislative elections of October 2014. She continues, in this electoral term, to call for an evolution of women rights in Tunisia.

Bochra Belhaj Hmida is also president of the Individual Freedom and Equality Commission (Commission des libertés individuelles et de l'égalité – Colibe) initiated by the Tunisian president Béji Caïd Essebsi on 13 August 2017. It aims to build a report concerning legislative reforms for individual freedom and equality, as required by the 2014 Constitution and by human rights international norms.

As a president of this commission, Bochra Belhaj Hmida leads a reform proposal of legacy between men and women, which generates an intense polemic in Tunisia. Its discussion is programmed for 2019.

Honors 
On 13 August 2018, Bochra Belhaj Hmida was distinguished with the insignia of Commander of the Order of Tunisian Republic (Ordre de la République tunisienne), by the Tunisian President, during the national Women Day. On 27 September 2018, she received an award from the foundation Global Hope Coalition. She was also named politician of the year in 2018 by the Tunisian press. In 2019, she was awarded the Fatima al-Fihriya Prize in recognition of her involvement in the process of individual freedoms and equality in Tunisia.

References

External links 

Year of birth missing (living people)
Living people
Tunisian women lawyers
21st-century Tunisian women politicians
21st-century Tunisian politicians
People from Zaghouan Governorate